Nilmoni may refer to:
 Nilmoni Phukan Sr, Assamese writer, poet, freedom fighter and politician
 Nilmoni Singha Dev, 19th-century Indian monarch
 Nilmoni Tagore, founder of the Jorasanko branch of Tagore family